George Schott (1836–1883) was a member of the Wisconsin State Assembly.

Biography
Schott was born on June 13, 1836 in the Kingdom of Württemberg. His parents and their 11 children moved to Canada in 1847 and subsequently to Herman, Dodge County, Wisconsin in 1849. In 1861 Schott married Caroline Bates, with whom he raised six children.

Career
In 1862 Schott became Town Treasurer of Herman and afterward Chairman. He was elected to the Assembly in 1872 and in 1876. From 1873 to 1874, he was a member of the Dodge County, Wisconsin Board. He was a Democrat. Schott died on September 28, 1883, in Hartford, Wisconsin and was buried in Herman.

References

1836 births
1883 deaths
People from Herman, Dodge County, Wisconsin
County supervisors in Wisconsin
Democratic Party members of the Wisconsin State Assembly
Württemberger emigrants to the United States
19th-century American politicians